Trachyedra is a genus of moth in the family Gelechiidae. It contains the species Trachyedra xylomorpha, which is found in India.

The wingspan is about 20 mm. The forewings are light brownish with a faint reddish tinge, some scattered fuscous scales. The anterior half of the costa is irregularly strigulated with dark fuscous irroration. There are minute black dots in the disc near the base, at one-fourth, and two-thirds. The disc is strewn with
irregular rough scales and there is an irregular dark fuscous and blackish blotch including raised scales in the disc before the middle, a projection at the lower angle indicating the plical stigma. There is a suffused dark fuscous and blackish spot on the costa about two-thirds and there are some dark fuscous scales on the costa before the apex. The hindwings are grey.

References

Pexicopiini